Brayden Pachal (born August 23, 1999) is a Canadian professional ice hockey defenceman currently playing for the Henderson Silver Knights of the American Hockey League (AHL), whom he serves as captain of, as a prospect for the Vegas Golden Knights of the National Hockey League (NHL).

Playing career

Pachal began in Junior A hockey with the Estevan Bruins of the Saskatchewan Junior Hockey League (SJHL), before joining the Victoria Royals of the Western Hockey League (WHL) for the 2015–16 season. Pachal spent a season and a half with Victoria, before being traded to the Prince Albert Raiders during the 2016–17 season. Pachal would then spend the next two seasons with Prince Albert, being named captain of the team ahead of the 2018–19 season; the same year, Pachal would lead the Raiders to their second WHL Championship.

As an undrafted free agent, Pachal was signed to a three-year entry-level contract by the Vegas Golden Knights on September 20, 2019, joining Vegas' then-American Hockey League (AHL) affiliate Chicago Wolves shortly afterward.

On January 20, 2022, in the midst of the 2021–22 season, Pachal was named captain of the Henderson Silver Knights, Vegas' new AHL affiliate. Pachal made his NHL debut with Vegas on March 15, 2022.

As a restricted free agent, Pachal signed a one-year contract extension with Vegas on July 28, 2022. Pachal recorded his first NHL point on December 15, 2022, with a secondary assist on Reilly Smith's empty-net goal against the Chicago Blackhawks.

Family
Pachal is a grandson of Vern Pachal, who played for the University of Alberta and at the minor professional level in the early 1950s in the Eastern Hockey League and American Hockey League. His cousin Clayton Pachal played in the NHL for the Boston Bruins and Colorado Rockies.

Career statistics

Awards and honours

References

External links

1999 births
Living people
Canadian ice hockey defencemen
Chicago Wolves players
Estevan Bruins players
Fort Wayne Komets players
Henderson Silver Knights players
Ice hockey people from Saskatchewan
People from Estevan
Prince Albert Raiders players
Undrafted National Hockey League players
Vegas Golden Knights players
Victoria Royals players